Patricia Monserrat Mendoza Jiménez is an Ecuadorian politician from the Democratic Center party. She attends the National Assembly on behalf of the Province of Esmereldas after the 2021 election.

Life
She qualified as a lawyer at the Central University of Ecuador. In 2011 she was at the Indoamerica Technological University gaining a master's degree in 2018.

Five years after the 2016 earthquake that hit the area, Mendoza welcomed measures passed in the National Assembly to encourage regeneration in the provinces of Esmeralda and Manabi. Funding would be available for projects including to supply loans and training for business people.

Mendoza and Luisa Gonzales jointly proposed 25 changes to the laws relating to the National Assembly in order to improve its productivity. They proposed changes to how a majority in favour should be defined and that the impeachment of the President and Vice-President should be deicided by a multi-party commission.

On 24 June 2022 she was among the members who requested a debate concerning the replacement of President Guillermo Lasso. 46 other members signed the request including Vanessa Álava, Jhajaira Urresta, María Vanessa Álava and Rosa Mayorga.

References 

Living people
Members of the National Assembly (Ecuador)
Women members of the National Assembly (Ecuador)
People from Esmeraldas Province
Year of birth missing (living people)
21st-century Ecuadorian women politicians
21st-century Ecuadorian politicians